Frans van Bronckhorst (born 19 November 1942) is an Indonesian boxer. He competed in the men's welterweight event at the 1976 Summer Olympics. He lost to Australia's Robert Dauer, by unanimous decision, in his only bout.

References

1942 births
Living people
Indonesian male boxers
Olympic boxers of Indonesia
Boxers at the 1976 Summer Olympics
Place of birth missing (living people)
Asian Games medalists in boxing
Boxers at the 1974 Asian Games
Asian Games bronze medalists for Indonesia
Medalists at the 1974 Asian Games
Southeast Asian Games medalists in boxing
Welterweight boxers
21st-century Indonesian people
20th-century Indonesian people